Sébastien Lareau and Sébastien Leblanc defeated Clinton Marsh and Marcos Ondruska in the final, 7–6(7–5), 4–6, 6–3 to win the boys' doubles tennis title at the 1990 Wimbledon Championships.

Seeds

  Sébastien Lareau /  Sébastien Leblanc (champions)
  Johan de Beer /  John-Laffnie de Jager (quarterfinals)
  Oliver Fernández /  Ernesto Muñoz de Cote (quarterfinals)
  Alistair Hunt /  Leander Paes (first round)
  Clinton Marsh /  Marcos Ondruska (final)
  Martin Damm /  Jan Kodeš (quarterfinals)
  Jon Leach /  Brian MacPhie (semifinals)
  Saša Hiršzon /  Mårten Renström (quarterfinals)

Draw

Finals

Top half

Bottom half

References

External links

Boys' Doubles
Wimbledon Championship by year – Boys' doubles